The Copper Salmon Wilderness is a protected wilderness area in the Southern Oregon Coast Range and is part of the Rogue River–Siskiyou National Forest. The wilderness area was created by the Omnibus Public Land Management Act of 2009, which was signed into law by President Barack Obama on March 30, 2009.

The Copper Salmon Wilderness is located along the North and South Forks of Elk River and the upper Middle Fork of Sixes River.

The area contains one of the nation's largest remaining stands of low-elevation old-growth forest and one of the healthiest salmon, steelhead, and cutthroat trout runs in the continental United States along the north Fork of the Elk River, as well as stands of vulnerable Port Orford cedar and endangered marbled murrelets and northern spotted owls.

See also
 List of Oregon Wildernesses
 List of U.S. Wilderness Areas
 List of old growth forests
 Wilderness Act

References

External links
Copper Salmon Wilderness - U.S. Forest Service

Protected areas of Coos County, Oregon
Protected areas of Curry County, Oregon
Rogue River-Siskiyou National Forest
Wilderness areas of Oregon
Old-growth forests
Protected areas established in 2009
2009 establishments in Oregon